Uusna is a village in Viljandi Parish, Viljandi County, in southern Estonia. As of 2011 Census, the settlement's population was 336.

References

Villages in Viljandi County
Viljandi Parish
Kreis Fellin